Claire Malroux (born 3 September 1925) is the pen name of French poet, essayist and translator Josette Andrée Malroux. Malroux has published a dozen poetry collections and also serves as the French translator for notable American poets such as Emily Dickinson and Wallace Stevens. Malroux's own poetry has been translated into English by Marilyn Hacker.

Early life
Malroux was born on 3 September 1925 in Albi, France. She studied at the École Normale Supérieure in Paris. Malroux was a teenager during World War II. Her father was Augustin Malroux, a socialist, teacher and member of the French Resistance, which led to his arrest, deportation and death during the war.

Career
Malroux has published 12 volumes of poetry, in addition to two "hybrid prose works." Four of those volumes (Edge, A Long-Gone Sun, Birds and Bison and Daybreak) have been translated into English by Hacker. Her 1998 work Soleil de jadis: recit poeme tells the story of World War II from a child's perspective through poetry.

Malroux has translated the works of numerous English-language poets into French, but cites Emily Dickinson as one of the most impactful, describing it as the "awakening of a personal affinity." In 1999, she was awarded the title of Chevalier de la Légion d’honneur for her translation work.

References

1925 births
Living people
French essayists
French translators
French women poets